Medina was a non-metropolitan district with the status of a borough on the Isle of Wight in England from 1974 to 1995.

The district was formed by the Local Government Act 1972, and was a merger of the municipal boroughs of Newport and Ryde along with the urban district of Cowes. It was one of two districts on the Island formed in 1974 - the other was South Wight.

"Medina" was an older name for Newport which has been preserved in the River Medina.

Following a review by the Local Government Commission for England, the borough was abolished on 1 April 1995, when a single Isle of Wight Council replaced the Isle of Wight County Council and the island's two district councils.

See also
Medina Borough Council elections

References

  

Former non-metropolitan districts of the Isle of Wight
Former boroughs in England